, also known as Vanibe, was a Japanese idol girl duo formed in 2007, under the indie label FLOWER LABEL, a sub-label of Tokuma Japan Communications.

Vanilla Beans has had the same line-up since March 2008, when Rika left and Risa joined. In June 2011 they joined the newly formed idol label T-Palette Records, to which they and Negicco were the first artists signed.

After four years under T-Palette Records, the band made its major debut in August 2015 signing a new contract with the popular avex trax label.

Rena, the original member, is a Japanese idol fan. She presents the show  posted on the Kawaii Girl Japan website. She conducts interviews and reports on other bands.

History

2007-2009 : The debut under Flower Label 
Managed by the talent agency LesPros Entertainment, the band formed in mid-2007 by Rika and Rena, later a member of the group Idoling! Under the independent label Flower Label, a sub-label of Tokuma Japan Communications, and describes itself as a "next generation idol" group. But before recording songs, the group visits on July 4, 2007 in Denmark, at the Embassy of Japan, to come forward and present its concept and art projects to the Danes attending this event.

The group released their first single entitled  "U ♡ Me" (reads "You love me") in two editions (regular and limited) on October 3, 2007 in Japan ; the first steps to reach the top of the charts are difficult and the single only reached the 189th place on Oricon weekly Singles Chart and remained there only for a week. This is the only disc released by the original formation of the idol group.

In March 2008, Rika left this group after the first single, and soon after, the female group Idoling!!!, to devote herself to her studies. After an audition, another girl, Lisa (or Risa) joined the band and it recorded its second single "nicola" in one edition, released on May 21, 2008 ; but sales of the single also failed and it is the 198th class Oricon.

The band no longer recorded discs until the end of 2008 but was very present on the net publishing several singles in digital format.

The band released a third single "Sakasaka Circus" in an edition on January 28, 2009 but not be included on any ranking. On 25 February 2009 the eponymous debut studio album, "Vanilla Beans", was released ; it contains the first three physical singles under Flower Label but will not ranked on Oricon chart. After these commercial failures, the group begins to work better; the fourth single "LOVE & HATE", whose music is then produced by a foreign artist (a European), was released on September 9, 2009 in two versions: "Love Version" and "Hate Version"; it ranked the 79th place on Oricon Weekly Singles Chart.

2010-2011 : "Vanilla Beans II" and new contract with T-Palette Records 
In 2010, the group recorded a mini-album "Def & Def", released in May and ranked the 79th place at Oricon Weekly Album Chart as the fourth single; it has sold at 1 155 copies during the first week. Furthermore, the first song of this EP, "D & D", is used in a commercial TV spot for deodorant brand of the same name D & D, with the lyrics of the song changed. The members of the group appear in the promotional video.

For the 2010 FIFA World Cup held in South Africa, the song "Re-Sepp-Ten" was re-recorded by the Japanese pop band Vanilla Beans known for their avid support of the Danish national team. The pop duo sang a slightly abbreviated version of the song in Danish language but with an unmistakable Japanese accent. and this despite the fact that Denmark and Japan were to meet in the final pool match to the finals. The release retitled "Re-Sepp-ten: Vi er røde, vi er hvide". A music video was made with then sitting Danish ambassador to Japan Franz-Michael Skjold Mellbin, playing the part of Preben Elkjær in the video. The music video was produced and directed by Emil Langballe.

At the end of the year, is for sale a compilation called "VaniBest" in September 2010, which ranked 160th place of Oricon and which is sold 887 copies during the first week of sale. "VaniBest" is the last album recorded under Flower Label Group ; the band signed the following year, together with the idol group Negicco a new contract with the idol label T-Palette Records in June 2011, newly founded by Ikuo Minewaki (President of Tower Records Japan). Soon after, Vanilla Beans impressed his fans with a single, considered as unofficial single, entitled "Tengoku e no Kaidan", released June 29, 2011, a cover song of "Stairway to Heaven" of the British band Led Zeppelin and marks the beginnings of the group under the label T-Palette Records; this single is the first disc to be released under this label and ranked 82nd at Oricon. The song is also a promotion, the only single from the band's second album "Vanilla Beans II" which comes out July 20, 2011 but the album does not succeed to reach the best rankings during the first week since the album was ranked 110th on Oricon chart and remains classified only for a week. It is the first album released respectively by T-Palette Records.

Members 

Current members
 Rena (レナ) (born in Shiga Prefecture)
 Lisa (リサ, or Risa) (born in Tokyo)

Former member
 Rika (リカ) (born on August 14, 1988) ; left the group in March 2008.

Discography

Albums 
 Studio albums

 Compilation albums

Extended plays

Singles 
Physical singles

References

External links 
 
 
 
 
 

Japanese electropop groups
Japanese girl groups
Japanese idol groups
Japanese pop music groups
Japanese house music groups
Musical groups established in 2007
Musical groups disestablished in 2018
Tokuma Japan Communications artists
Japanese musical duos
Pop music duos
Female musical duos